Ologamasus is a genus of mites in the family Ologamasidae. There are about 19 described species in Ologamasus.

Species
These 19 species belong to the genus Ologamasus:

 Ologamasus aberrans (Berlese, 1888)
 Ologamasus brevidigitus Karg & Schorlemmer, 2009
 Ologamasus brevisetosus Karg & Schorlemmer, 2009
 Ologamasus cananeiae Silva, Moraes & Krantz, 2007
 Ologamasus cavei Sheals, 1962
 Ologamasus distorta (Karg, 1976)
 Ologamasus foliatus Karg, 1976
 Ologamasus lanceolatus (Karg, 1976)
 Ologamasus latoventer Karg & Schorlemmer, 2009
 Ologamasus mahunkai (Karg, 1979)
 Ologamasus membranosus Karg, 1976
 Ologamasus microcrinis (Karg, 1979)
 Ologamasus postpilus Karg & Schorlemmer, 2009
 Ologamasus simplicior (Berlese, 1914)
 Ologamasus simplicitus Karg & Schorlemmer, 2009
 Ologamasus striolatosimilis Karg, 1976
 Ologamasus striolatus (Berlese, 1916)
 Ologamasus testudinis (Karg, 1976)
 Ologamasus trituberculatus Karg & Schorlemmer, 2009

References

Ologamasidae